Life, Love and Leaving is the second album by The Detroit Cobras, released 1 May 2001 (see 2001 in music).

Track listing

Hey Sailor
Original by Mickey Lee Lane as "Hey Sah-Lo-Ney" (1965)
Written by Mickey Lee Lane
He Did It
Original by The Ronettes (1965)
Written by Jackie DeShannon / Sharon Sheeley
Find Me a Home
Original by Solomon Burke as "Home in Your Heart" (1963)
Written by Otis Blackwell / Winfield Scott
Oh My Lover
Original by The Chiffons (1962)
Written by Ronnie Mack
Cry On
Original by Irma Thomas (1961)
Written by Allen Toussaint
Stupidity
Original by The Van Dykes (1962)
Written by Solomon Burke
Bye Bye Baby
Original by Mary Wells (1960)
Written by Mary Wells
Boss Lady
Original by Davis & Jones and The Fenders as "Boss with the Hot Sauce" (1964)
Written by George Davis / Willard Jones
Laughing at You
Original by The Gardenias (1957)
Written by John Gibson / Lee Hohisel
Can't Miss Nothing
Original by Ike and Tina Turner as "You Can't Miss Nothing That You Never Had" (1964)
Written by Ike Turner
Right Around the Corner
Original by The "5" Royales (1955)
Written by Rose Marie McCoy / Charles Singleton
Won't You Dance with Me
Original by Billy Lee and The Rivieras (1964)
Written by Jim McCarty / Mitch Ryder
Let's Forget About the Past
Original by Clyde McPhatter (1962)
Written by Clyde McPhatter
Shout Bama Lama
Original by Otis Redding and The Pinetoppers (1962)
Written by Otis Redding

Personnel
Rachel Nagy	 – 	vocals
Maribel (Mary) Ramirez 	 – 	guitar
Dante Aliano	(Dante Adrian White) – 	guitar
Eddie Harsch	 – 	bass/organ/piano
Damian Lang	 – 	drums
Also
James Wailin	 – 	harmonica
Jeff Grand	 – 	slide guitar

Trivia
The Detroit Cobras rendition of "Hey Sailor" was used in the soundtrack to the Angel episode "Harm's Way".

2001 albums
The Detroit Cobras albums